Ernst Kötter was a German mathematician.

Education
Kötter graduated in 1884 from the University of Berlin under the supervision of Karl Weierstrass and Leopold Kronecker.

Career
Kötter's treatise "Fundamentals of a purely geometrical theory of algebraic plane curves" gained the 1886 prize of the Berlin Royal Academy.

In 1901, he published his report on "The development of synthetic geometry from Monge to Staudt (1847)";
it had been sent to the press as early as 1897, but completion was deferred by Kötter's appointment to Aachen University and a subsequent persisting illness.
He constructed a mobile wood model to illustrate the theorems of Dandelin spheres.

In a discussion with Schoenflies and Kötter, Hilbert reportedly uttered his famous quotation according to which points, lines, and planes in geometry could be named as well "tables, chairs, and beer mugs".

Publications

References

19th-century German mathematicians
Geometers
1859 births
1922 deaths
20th-century German mathematicians